The long-tailed shrew rat (Tateomys macrocercus) is a species of rodent in the family Muridae.
It is found only in Central Sulawesi, Indonesia, where it is known only from Mount Nokilalaki in Sigi Regency.

References

Tateomys
Rodents of Sulawesi
Mammals described in 1982
Taxonomy articles created by Polbot